is most famous for killing Hosokawa Gracia to protect her honor when Ishida Mitsunari attempted to take her hostage. Afterwards he and the rest of the household then committed seppuku and burned their mansion down.

References

16th-century births
1600 deaths
Ogasawara clan
Samurai